Ergalatax junionae is a species of sea snail, a marine gastropod mollusc in the family Muricidae, the murex snails or rock snails.

Description

Distribution
 Persian Gulf and Gulf of Oman

References

3- Vine, P. (1986). Red Sea Invertebrates. Immel Publishing, London. 224 pp.

Ergalatax
Gastropods described in 2008